Lee Do-seong (born March 22, 1984) is a South Korean football player.

Lee previously played for Daejeon Citizen, Goyang Zaicro, and Seoul E-Land in the K League.

References

External links 

1984 births
Living people
South Korean footballers
Association football midfielders
Daejeon Hana Citizen FC players
Goyang Zaicro FC players
Seoul E-Land FC players
K League 1 players
Korea National League players
K League 2 players